Island Princess may refer to:
 The Island Princess, a play by John Fletcher
 , a steamboat operated by Canadian Pacific Railway in the early 1900s
 , a cruise ship operated by Princess Cruises from 1974 to 1999
 , a cruise ship operated by Princess Cruises starting in 2003.
 The Island Princess (film), a 1954 Italian-Spanish comedy film directed by Paolo Moffa